Gonçalo Francisco Gonçalves Mesquita de Foro (born 14 April 1982 in Lisbon) is a Portuguese rugby union footballer. He plays as a wing and as a centre.

Currently he's a member of CDUL squad.

He was selected to the Portuguese squad that participated at the 2007 Rugby World Cup finals, playing in the game with Italy, that ended in a 31–5 loss.

He had 64 caps for the "Lobos", from 2007 to 2017, with 22 tries scored, 110 points in aggregate.

References

External links
Gonçalo Foro International Statistics

1982 births
Living people
Portuguese rugby union players
Rugby union wings
Portugal international rugby sevens players
Rugby union players from Lisbon
Portugal international rugby union players